Castel Benito (called originally in Italian "Tripoli-Castel Benito Airport") was an airport of Tripoli created by the Italians in Italian Libya. Originally, it was a small military airport, but it was enlarged in the late 1930s and was later used by the British RAF after 1943. It was called RAF Castel Benito by the Allies.

RAF Castel Benito (later RAF Idris) was a Royal Air Force station near Tripoli in Libya between 1943 and 1966.

History
 1934: A Regia Aeronautica (Italian Air Force) airfield was created on the south edge of Italian Tripoli. It was the operational base for the "15° Stormo da bombardamento" with Savoia Marchetti SM. 79 and SM.81 as well as the "13° Gruppo da caccia" with Fiat CR.32 and CR.42.
 Shortly before World War II: The first units of Italian parachutists were trained and formed there. The first Italian Military Parachute School was there. The first troops trained were two Libyan battalions, the Libyan Parachute Battalion and the 1st National Libyan Parachute Battalion, of the Royal Colonial Corps.
 1938: The Italian Libya governor Italo Balbo enlarged the military airfield into Tripoli-Castel Benito Airport (located 33 km south of Tripoli) and created an international airport for civilians served mainly by Ala Littoria, the official Italian airline: the Aeroporto di Tripoli-Castel Benito. The airport was connected to Rome by the "Linee Aeree Transcontinentali Italiane" (LATI), that ran a postal (and civilian service) to Africa, Asia and South America from Italy. The new airport had direct flights to Tunis and Malta, run with Savoia-Marchetti SM-73 of "Ala littoria". Castel Benito airport was connected with internal airports of Libya, such as Benghazi (Benina International Airport), Ghadames (Ghadames Airport), Sabha (Sabha Air Base), and Kufra (Kufra Airport). Another flight served by "Ala Littoria" was towards the Africa Orientale Italiana, with more than 4000 km: it was used mainly for military transport and mail service and was created in 1935, from Tripoli to Kassala (Sudan) and Asmara in Italian Eritrea. It was served by the Caproni Ca.308 Borea, with capacity for a crew of 2 but with only 6 passengers.[7]
 1938: Air France started a regular flight from Marseille to Tripoli, later enlarged to Benghazi and Damascus.
 1938: The Ala Littoria's international flights from the new civilian airport were:
Rome – Malta – Tripoli
Rome – Tunisi – Tripoli
Rome – Tripoli – Benghazi
 Spring 1939: A flight was started to Eritrea, Ethiopia and Somalia: Rome – Tripoli (Benghazi) – Cairo – Khartoum – Asmara – Addis Ababa – Mogadishu (nearly 7000 km)
 1939: A passenger service with international travels was started by Ala Littoria to Rome (Italy) and Addis Ababa (Ethiopia and Africa Orientale Italiana): it was one of the first intercontinental flights in world history and was called Linea dell'Impero. The service was done (using mainly the Benghazi airport, but even the Tripoli-Castel Benito airport) with Savoia-Marchetti SM-83 carrying nearly 30 passengers.
 Summer 1939: The possibility was experimented of direct flights between Libya and Eritrea, bypassing Egypt and Sudan controlled by the United Kingdom. Bruno Mussolini (a son of Benito Mussolini), an experienced aviator, flew direct from Castel Benito airport to Kufra airport (near the desert border Libya-Sudan) and to Asmara in Italian Eritrea: this new route was used by military airplanes after World War II started.
 1939: More and more attracted by the idea of establishing a similar regular service between Italy and Italian East Africa, Bruno Mussolini (in the meantime appointed general manager of LATI) and his staff carried out a long technical cruise with their SM83-ATTE to Tripoli and the Kufra Oasis (Libya), Asmara, Massaua, Gura and Agordat (Eritrea). The voyage proved to be very useful to learn those flight experiences necessary for the future war missions. The airport was used also as a military base, where some Savoia-Marchetti SM-74 operated successfully as civilian transport airplanes.
 1 September 1939: World War II started.

 November/December 1941 and December 1942/January 1943: The most destructive of many Allied air raids on the airport.
 7 January 1943: The last of these airplanes, a Savoia-Marchetti S.74, did the last flight to Italy from Tripoli-Castel Benito airport before the British Army arrived.
 23 January 1943: The British Army took Tripoli. The airfield was renamed RAF Castel Benito and was used by a number of Allied operational squadrons involved in the desert war and in the Tunisia battles, sometimes for only a few days or weeks at a time.
 Post-War: The airfield was used as a staging post for flights to and from Central and Southern Africa.
 1951: The station was renamed Tripoli Idris Airport.  The name was chosen to honour the Libyan King Idris at the request of the Libyan government. The station was used as a staging post for flights to and from the United Kingdom to the Middle East and Far East. It was also used in the 1950s as a base for aircraft using the Libyan desert bombing ranges for practice. 
 September 1969: The station was closed (see also Kingdom of Libya#Foreign policy) when Libya became a republic. The airfield is now known as Tripoli International Airport.

Units and aircraft

Bibliography
Abate, Rosario. Dal Borea ai Libeccio (Ca.308-Ca.318). Edizioni dell'Ateneo & Bizzarri. Milano, 1978
Ferrari, Paolo. L'aeronautica italiana. Una storia del Novecento. Franco Angeli Storia ed. Milano, 2005 .
Maravigna, Pietro. Come abbiamo perduto la guerra in Africa. Editoriale Tosi. Roma, 1949.
Rosselli, Alberto. The air links between Italy and Eastern Africa.June 1940-November 1941 Nuova Aurora Edizioni. Firenze, 2012
Thompson, Jonathan W. (1963). Italian Civil and Military aircraft 1930-1945 Aero Publishers Inc. New York, 1963 .

See also
List of former Royal Air Force stations
Tripoli International Airport
Ala Littoria
LATI
Linea dell'Impero
Ascari del Cielo Paratroops

References

Citations

Bibliography

Jefford, C.G. RAF Squadrons, a Comprehensive Record of the Movement and Equipment of all RAF Squadrons and their Antecedents since 1912. Shrewsbury, Shropshire, UK: Airlife Publishing, 1988. .
Sturtivant, Ray, ISO and John Hamlin. RAF Flying Training And Support Units since 1912. Tonbridge, Kent, UK: Air-Britain (Historians) Ltd., 2007. .

Royal Air Force stations in Africa
Royal Air Force stations of World War II in Africa
World War II airfields in Libya
Libya in World War II
Airports established in 1943
World War II sites in Libya
Airports in Libya
Defunct airports
Buildings and structures in Tripoli, Libya